The Miss Georgia Teen USA competition is the pageant that selects the representative for the state of Georgia in the Miss Teen USA pageant. This pageant is directed Greenwood Productions under the ownership of Miss Tennessee USA 1989 Kim Greenwood. The pageant is hosted on McDonough, Georgia.

Georgia is in the top 5 most successful states at Miss Teen USA in terms of number and value of placements. Despite this, like their sister pageant, Miss Georgia USA, they have never won the competition despite having placed 2nd, 3rd, 4th, and 5th as well as several finalist and semi-finalist spots. They have never won any of the main awards, but did win Style awards in 1999 and 2000.

Four Georgia teens later won the Miss Georgia USA crown, and two others won the Miss Indiana USA and Miss Virginia USA titles, respectively. Kelly Jerles, the first Miss Georgia Teen USA, became the first Teen titleholder to compete at Miss America, representing Georgia in 1987. Another Georgia teen also competed for Alabama at that pageant.

Denim Lovett of Warner Robins was crowned Miss Georgia Teen USA 2023 on November 19, 2022 at Henry County Performing Arts Center in McDonough. She will represent Georgia for the title of Miss Teen USA 2023.

Results summary

Placements
1st runners-up: Meredith Young (1991), Whitney Fuller (1994), Brooke Fletcher (2009)
2nd runners-up: Holly Roehl (1990), Shayla Jackson (2020)
3rd runners-up: Kelly Jerles (1983), Julia Martin (2013)
4th runners-up: Kimberly Harlan (2002), Brittany Sharp (2006)
Top 5/6: Danesha Reid (1993), Abby Vaillancourt (2000)
Top 10: Meredith Brown (1985), Hope Allen (1987), Brandy Drake (2001), Katie Conkle (2005), Savannah Miles (2018)
Top 15/16: Brooke Calhoun (2004), Kristen Robinson (2011), Courtney Smits (2012), Bentley Wright (2016), Liza Greenberg (2021), Courtney Ianna Smith (2022)
Georgia holds a record of 22 placements at Miss Teen USA.

Awards
Style Award: Abby Vaillancourt (2000), Brandy Drake (2001)

Winners

References

External links
Official website

Georgia
Women in Georgia (U.S. state)